Endau is a small town in Mersing District, Johor, Malaysia. It lies on the northern tip of east Johor, on the border with Pahang.

Name
The town was named Endau after a peranakan Indian who resided in the area. In the 19th century it was known to the British as Blair's Harbour.

History
The town was opened by Dato' Mohd Ali by an order from Temenggong Ibrahim. The town expanded due to its location as the center of economy for the people who worked in the trading, fishing and logging sectors at that time.

Economy
The town is one of the largest fishing ports on the East Coast of Peninsular Malaysia.

Education

Primary school

Sekolah Kebangsaan Teriang
Sekolah Kebangsaan Telok Lipat
Sekolah Kebangsaan Tanjung Resang
Sekolah Kebangsaan Pusat Air Tawar
Sekolah Kebangsaan Penyabong
Sekolah Kebangsaan Lembaga Endau
Sekolah Kebangsaan Labung
Sekolah Kebangsaan Bandar Endau
Sekolah Jenis Kebangsaan (Cina) St Joseph (M)
Sekolah Jenis Kebangsaan (Cina) Kampung Hubong
Sekolah Jenis Kebangsaan (Cina) Chiao Ching

Secondary school
Sekolah Menengah Kebangsaan Ungku Husin

Climate
Endau has a tropical rainforest climate (Af) with heavy to very heavy rainfall year-round and with extremely heavy rainfall in December.

References

Mersing District
Towns in Johor